Mailliard may refer to:
Charlotte Mailliard Shultz (born 1933), American heiress and socialite
William S. Mailliard (1917–1992), member of the U.S. House of Representatives from California